Langarud County is in Gilan province, Iran. The capital of the county is the city of Langarud. At the 2006 census, the county's population was 133,133 in 38,597 households. The following census in 2011 counted 137,272 people in 44,344 households. At the 2016 census, the county's population was 140,686 in 49,351 households.

Administrative divisions

The population history of Langarud County's administrative divisions over three consecutive censuses is shown in the following table. The latest census shows three districts, seven rural districts, and five cities.

References

 
Counties of Gilan Province